Hywel Coetmor was a Welsh knight who took part in Owain Glyndŵr's rising. He had earlier fought under the Black Prince at the Battle of Poitiers (1356). His brother was Rhys Gethin, who was one of Glyndŵr's leading generals.

He married Gwenllian, a daughter of Rhys ap Robert (d. 1377), a prominent nobleman who had supported Owain Lawgoch. An effigy of him can be seen in St Grwst's Church at Llanrwst.

References
R. R. Davies, The Revolt of Owain Glyndŵr (Rhydychen, 1995)
J. Gwynfor Jones (ed.), The History of the Gwydir Family and Memoirs (The Welsh Classics, 1990)

Welsh rebels
14th-century Welsh military personnel
14th-century soldiers
Welsh knights